Mae Fa(h) Luang (Thai: แม่ฟ้าหลวง, English : Royal Mother from the sky) may refer to:

 Mae Fah Luang International Airport, Chiang Rai, Thailand
 Mae Fah Luang University, Chiang Rai Province, Thailand
 Amphoe Mae Fa Luang, Chiang Rai Province, Thailand
 Srinagarindra (1900 – 1995), a member of the Thai Royal Family